Lime Mountain is a summit in the U.S. state of Nevada.

Lime Mountain was named for deposits of lime in the area.

References

Mountains of Elko County, Nevada